Right on Time is the fifth studio album by country music recording artist Gretchen Wilson. It album was released on April 2, 2013 via Redneck Records. "Still Rollin'" was released on February 18, 2013 and served as the album's lead-off single. "One Good Friend" was also previously released as a single in June 2012, and "Crazy" was released on July 8, 2013 as the album's third single.

Critical reception

Right on Time has received generally positive reviews from music critics. Steve Leggett of Allmusic gave the album four stars out of five and said that the "aptly named Right on Time shows that Wilson is capable of much more than just country honky tonk anthems, and in fact, this set is way more garage rock blues than it is country, with some late-night jazz, soul, and funk thrown in as well, and it's clearly a statement that Wilson isn't about to sit still musically." At Country Weekly, Tammy Ragusa graded the album a B, which means it is an "above average" release, and evoked how Gretchen Wilson "definitely showcases an artist more comfortable in her skin and confident in her musical choices." Phyllis Hunter of Got Country Online alluded to how this album "seems to have a little bit of everything that Wilson has been thru, and like her, it is tough and cool…but there is a lot of heart under it all." Nashville Country Club's Robbie Huff affirmed that "whether it be rock, blues, country, soul, or funk, whatever this album is it is good. The pacing of the album is done very well. Never does the album seem to repeat its vibe or even its tempo. It bounces seamlessly from hard rock to slow piano driven jazz. It would seem that Gretchen Wilson is back, and she is 'Right On Time.'" Matt Bjorke of Roughstock awarded the album three-and-a-half stars out of five, expressing that Right on Time "doesn't find Wilson chasing trends anymore." He complimented Wilson's "natural soulful voice" and the variety of songs offered on the album.

Track listing

Personnel
Jeff Armstrong – Hammond B-3 organ, keyboards, piano
Ron Gannaway – drums, percussion
Jeff Lockerman – bass guitar, upright bass
Josh Malter – background vocals on "My Truck"
Tony Obrohta – acoustic guitar, electric guitar
Grace Penner – background vocals
Scott Sweepy Walker – harmonica
Ryan Wariner – acoustic guitar, electric guitar
Gretchen Wilson – percussion, lead vocals, background vocals

Chart performance

Album

Singles

References

2013 albums
Gretchen Wilson albums